The Cameroon rainforest snake (Dendrolycus elapoides) is a species of snake.  It is monotypical of the genus, Dendrolycus.

References

 GBIF.org

Lamprophiidae
Reptiles described in 1874